Grandhalaya Sarvaswam is a Telugu periodical related to the library science and Library and information science. The Andhra Pradesh Library Association in India has been publishing this periodical since the year 1915 for the development of the library movement. It is the oldest regional language periodical in the country. The earliest volumes of the periodical were covering the news and articles related to libraries, news regarding children's force, literary discussions, modern poems, songs rendered in connection with library movement, featured articles related to the history and science. Gradually, libraries, book reviews were included, along with the contents of the Gandhiji's constructive program. It began publishing orders issued by the Andhra Pradesh public library directorate for the benefit of employees working in district libraries.

Publication History
Prior to the publication of Grandhalaya Sarvaswam, the library community, those who work for the library-related issues had to rely on other journals to publish their articles, news, opinions. So the Andhra Desa Library Association launched its own magazine as quarterly in 1915, which was published as a bimonthly journal two years later. The Association began publishing the periodical as a monthly magazine after Volume 6. The same periodical was stopped for a while in mid-1921 and started again in July 1928 as a monthly. This library periodical publication though was stopped between the years 1930–33, could restore it in 1934, and complete 11 volumes. Although the publication encountered some fluctuations, the Grandhalaya Sarvaswam was reintroduced due to the pioneering efforts of the father of the library movement, Ayyanki Venkata Ramanaiah, from January 1948 and is still being published uninterruptedly.

Between September 1939 and October 1941, the magazine was published quarterly under the name Andhra Granthalayam in both Telugu (the languages of Andhra Pradesh) and English languages. Its publication in English has spread to other states and continents. Publication stalled in the wake of the dearth of paper in World War II. So, the Association has published the editions of the 23,24 Andhra Pradesh Grandhalaya Conferences held in Pedapalem of Tenali Taluka and Hindupur in Anantapur District, respectively, in the place of Grandhalaya Sarvaswam. Since the situation was improved, this library periodical publication was restored under the same name, has been publishing still now on a regular basis.

Editors
Ayyanki Venkata Ramanaiah, Paturi Nagabhushanam, Gadde Ramamurthy served so far as the editors of this library periodical. Raavi Sarada, who is the daughter of Paturi Nagabhushanam, has continued to be the editor, printer, and publisher of the Sarwasavam periodical since the year 1989. Details are given below.

Special Issues
The association has been publishing special issues of Grandhalaya Sarvaswam on special occasions, devoting to the literature pertaining to a specific subject or event. The December issue of every year, devoted to the news, items related to the "National Library Week" celebrations in various public and other libraries in Andhra Pradesh and Telangana.
 The special issues published from 2010 onwards are given here.
 Rabindranath Tagore 150th birthday Special Issue  (2012 May)   
 Nagineni Venkaiah, the leader of Library movement, farming 100th Birthday Special Issue (2013 July). 
 Andhra Pradesh Library Association Centenary Celebrations Special Issue (2014 May) 
 Kodati Narayana Rao 100th birthday celebrations (2014 December)   
 Grandhalaya Pitamaha Padmasree Ayyanki Venkataramanaiah, 125th Birthday Special Issue (2015 July)  
 S.R.Ranganathan's 125th birthday Special Issue (2017 August) 
 Veeresalingam 100th Birthday Special Issue (2019 May)   
 Mahatma Gandhi's 150th Birthday Special Issue (2019 October)  
 Gadicherla Harisarvottama Rao 60th death anniversary issue (2020 March)

The Andhra Pradesh Library Association, which publishes the magazine, set up their own building in Vijayawada in 1939 and named it after Gadicherla Hari Sarottama Rao. The Association has been preserving all the volumes of the periodical in this building which was instrumental in promoting the library movement in Andhra Pradesh state.

References

1915 establishments in India
Publications established in 1915
Library and information science journals